Atlético Boca del Río is a Mexican football club that plays in group 3 in the Tercera División de México. The club is based in Boca del Río, Veracruz and is affiliated to Tiburones Rojos de Veracruz .

History
The club was founded in 1988 as  Club Deportivo Atlético Veracruz been a affiliate of Liga de Ascenso club Tiburones Rojos. In 1990 the clubs changes its name to Deportivo Atlético Boca del Río playing in the Tercera División de México managing to gain the Promotion to the Segunda División de México.

True put the clubs History the club has managed to develop quality players that have shined in the first divisions always playing in the Inferior division never reaching the First.

See also
Football in Mexico

External links
Official Page

References 

Football clubs in Veracruz
1988 establishments in Mexico